Morgan Jeanette Turner (born April 29, 1999) is an American actor best known for playing Martha Kaply in the Jumanji franchise.

Personal life
Turner attended Methacton High School in Fairview Village, Pennsylvania.
Turner is non-binary and pansexual; their TikTok profile uses they/them pronouns.

Filmography

References

External links
 
 
 

1999 births
Living people
21st-century American actors
American child actors
American film actors
American non-binary actors
Actors from Pennsylvania
LGBT people from Pennsylvania
Pansexual non-binary people